Ingredients in a Recipe for Soul is a 1963 album by Ray Charles. It was arranged by Benny Carter, Sid Feller, Marty Paich, and Johnny Parker, with the Paich tracks also featuring accompaniment by the Jack Halloran Singers.

In 1990, the album was released on compact disc by DCC with four bonus tracks. In 1997, it was packaged together with 1964's Have a Smile with Me on a two-for-one CD reissue on Rhino with historical liner notes.

Track listing
 "Busted" (Harlan Howard) – 2:15
 "Where Can I Go?" (Leo Fuld, Sigmunt Berland, Sonny Miller) – 3:29
 "Born to Be Blue" (Mel Tormé, Robert Wells) – 2:53
 "That Lucky Old Sun" (Beasley Smith, Haven Gillespie) – 4:20
 "Ol' Man River" (Oscar Hammerstein, Jerome Kern) – 5:29
 "In the Evening (When The Sun Goes Down)" (Leroy Carr) – 5:50
 "A Stranger In Town" (Mel Tormé) – 2:26
 "Ol' Man Time" (Cliff Friend) – 2:27
 "Over the Rainbow" (Harold Arlen, E.Y. Harburg) – 4:09
 "You'll Never Walk Alone" (Hammerstein, Richard Rodgers) – 4:00

Bonus tracks (1990 CD release)
 "Something's Wrong" – 2:49
 "The Brightest Smile in Town" – 2:47
 "Worried Life Blues" (with Sid Feller) – 3:07
 "My Baby! (I Love Her, Yes I Do)" (Ray Charles) – 3:04

References

External links
[ Album review at AMG]

1963 albums
Ray Charles albums
ABC Records albums
Rhino Records albums
Albums arranged by Benny Carter
Albums arranged by Sid Feller
Albums arranged by Marty Paich
Albums produced by Ray Charles
Albums produced by Sid Feller